Old Speck Mountain, also known as Old Speckle Mountain, is a mountain located in Oxford County, Maine, United States. The mountain, the fourth-highest in the state, is the northeasternmost and highest of the Mahoosuc Range, the northeasternmost part of the White Mountains. Old Speck is flanked to the southwest by Mahoosuc Arm, and faces Baldpate Mountain to the northeast across Grafton Notch.

Old Speck is within the watershed of the Androscoggin River, which drains into Merrymeeting Bay, the estuary of the Kennebec River, and then into the Gulf of Maine. The north and east faces of Old Speck drain into the Bear River, then into the Androscoggin. The southeast and southwest faces drain into the Bull Branch of Goose Eye Brook, then into the Sunday River and the Androscoggin. The northwest face drains into Silver Stream, then into Chickwolnepy Stream and the Androscoggin.

The summit of Old Speck is on the southern boundary of Grafton Notch State Park. A short side trail runs from the Appalachian Trail to the summit of the mountain. The Appalachian Trail descends  from a location near the summit of Old Speck Mountain to the pond.

See also 
 List of mountains of Maine

References

Mountains of Oxford County, Maine
White Mountains (New Hampshire)
New England Four-thousand footers
Mountains on the Appalachian Trail
Mountains of Maine